Laikipia East Constituency is an electoral constituency in Kenya. It is one of three constituencies in Laikipia County, in the former Rift Valley Province. The constituency was established for the 1966 elections.

Members of Parliament

Wards

References 

Constituencies in Laikipia County
Constituencies in Rift Valley Province
1966 establishments in Kenya
Constituencies established in 1966